Colotis pleione, the orange patch tip, is a butterfly in the family Pieridae. It is found in Arabia, Ethiopia, Somalia, Kenya, Sudan and Chad. The habitat consists of very dry savanna to sub-deserts.

The larvae feed on Capparis, Cadaba and Cleome species.

Subspecies
Colotis pleione pleione (western and southern Arabia)
Colotis pleione heliocaustus (Butler, 1886) (Ethiopia, Somalia, northern and north-eastern Kenya)
Colotis pleione nilus Talbot, 1942 (southern and central Sudan, Chad)

References

Butterflies described in 1829
pleione
Butterflies of Africa